RCSA may refer to:

Racing Club de Strasbourg Alsace, French football club
Reformed Churches in South Africa, Christian denomination in South Africa 
Research Corporation for Science Advancement, American organization
Residual chemical shift anisotropy
Robotics Certification Standards Alliance, company
Royal College of Science Association
Animal welfare and rights in South Africa, RabbitCare South Africa (RCSA)